is a passenger train station in the city of Chikusei, Ibaraki, Japan, operated by the private railway company Kantō Railway.

Lines

Station layout
The station consists of one side platform and one island platform, connected to the station building by a level crossing. The station is unattended.

Platforms

Adjacent stations

History
Kurogo Station was opened on 11 January 1913 as a station on the Jōsō Railroad, which became the Kantō Railway in 1965. The station building was rebuilt in August 2003.

Passenger statistics
In fiscal 2018, the station was used by an average of 78 passengers daily (boarding passengers only).

Surrounding area
 Kurogo Post Office

See also
 List of railway stations in Japan

References

External links

 Kantō Railway Station Information 

Railway stations in Ibaraki Prefecture
Railway stations in Japan opened in 1913
Chikusei